The rusty-flanked treecreeper (Certhia nipalensis) or the Nepal treecreeper is a species of bird in the family Certhiidae.
It is found in northern India, Nepal, Bhutan and western Yunnan.
Its natural habitats are boreal forests and temperate forests.

References

rusty-flanked treecreeper
Birds of Nepal
Birds of Bhutan
Birds of Northeast India
Birds of Yunnan
rusty-flanked treecreeper
rusty-flanked treecreeper
Taxonomy articles created by Polbot